Chiserley is a hamlet located on a hilltop near the town of Hebden Bridge, in the county of West Yorkshire, England. The Hamlet falls within the Calder ward of Calderdale.

History 
It was called Chisley until 1964, but was changed to Chiserley on the 1979 OS map. Once it was a hamlet of farms, mills and terrace houses for mill-workers but now it is a village.

References

External links

Villages in West Yorkshire
Geography of Calderdale